Deep Cover is a 1992 American action thriller film starring Laurence Fishburne, Jeff Goldblum and Charles Martin Smith, and directed by veteran actor Bill Duke in his third directorial outing. The screenplay was written by Henry Bean and Academy Award-nominee Michael Tolkin.

Fishburne plays a police officer who goes undercover in a sting operation in Los Angeles to bring down a West Coast drug cartel. The film received positive reviews, being likened by some critics to a modern film noir. It is also notable for its theme song of the same title, composed by Dr. Dre and released as his debut solo single, which also features then-newcomer Snoop Doggy Dogg making his studio debut.

Plot
In Cleveland, at Christmas 1972, Russell Stevens Jr. is the son of a drug-addicted, alcoholic man, who tells his son never to be like him. Stevens then witnesses his father getting shot and killed while robbing a liquor store. He swears that he will never end up like him.

In 1991, Stevens is a police officer. He is recruited by DEA Special Agent Gerald Carver to go undercover in Los Angeles, claiming that his criminal-like character traits will be more of a benefit undercover than they would serve him as a uniformed policeman. Stevens poses as drug dealer "John Hull" in order to infiltrate and work his way up the network of the West Coast's largest drug importer, Anton Gallegos and his uncle Hector Guzmán, a South American politician. Stevens relocates to a cheap hotel in Los Angeles and begins dealing cocaine.

One day, Stevens is arrested by the devoutly religious LAPD Narcotics Detective Taft and his corrupt partner Hernández, as he buys a kilogram in a set-up by Gallegos' low-level street supplier Eddie Dudley. At his arraignment, Stevens discovers that he bought baby laxative instead of cocaine, and his case is dismissed. Stevens' self-appointed attorney David Jason, who is also a drug trafficker in Gallegos' network, rewards Stevens' silence with more cocaine and introduces Stevens to Felix Barbossa, the underboss to Gallegos. Felix kills Eddie when he finds out he's working with the LAPD and enlists Stevens as Eddie's replacement.

Stevens develops a romance with Betty McCutcheon, the manager of an art dealership which is a front to launder Jason's drug money. When one of Stevens' dealers is murdered by a rival dealer, Stevens is informed by Jason that if he doesn't retaliate, other street dealers will view it as a sign of weakness, and in turn murder him. Steven follows the rival dealer to a nightclub, corners him in a bathroom, and kills him. Jason then partners with Stevens in his new business: distribution of a synthetic chemical variant of cocaine.

It is revealed that Barbossa is a confidential informant working with Detective Hernández. After a falling out, in which Stevens correctly deduces that Barbossa wants Jason killed due to his business venture which would threaten Barbossa's, Felix immediately gives up Stevens, Jason, and Betty to Hernandez, and wants Jason killed during the arrest. Carver knows about this, but refuses to interfere, forcing Stevens to violate orders and stop it himself by exposing Felix, which results in a vengeful Jason killing him, while Betty reneges on the drug business because of it with Stevens' protection.

Gallegos comes to meet with Jason and Stevens and informs them that they have inherited Felix's debts to him. Later that day, Stevens meets with Carver to tell him about his meeting with Gallegos. Instead, Carver pulls a gun on Stevens and orders him to surrender his weapon and get in his car. Angrily, Stevens disarms Carver and forces him to admit that the State Department has decided to leave Gallegos alone because Guzmán may some day be useful as a political asset to them and Carver has decided to play along in exchange for career advancement. Stevens' disillusionment reaches its conclusion, and he abandons his undercover status, vowing to take down Gallegos and Guzmán alone.

Stevens and Jason learn that Gallegos is going to kill them anyway, so they kill him first and steal a van storing over $100 million of Gallegos' cash. Jason and Stevens invite Guzmán to a shipyard and offer to return 80% of Gallegos' money if he agrees to invest the remaining 20% in their synthetic cocaine operation. Detective Taft, who has been tailing Stevens, interrupts the deal but is unable to arrest Guzmán because of his diplomatic immunity. Guzmán leaves. Taft orders Stevens to surrender, but is shot and killed by Jason. Stevens reveals himself as a police officer and attempts to arrest Jason, but is forced to kill him in self-defense.

Afterward, Carver coerces Stevens into testifying in favor of him and the DEA in return for not charging Betty with money laundering. Stevens produces a videotape of the incriminating conversation with Guzmán at the shipyard during his testimony to the House Judiciary Subcommittee, ruining the State Department's intentions along with Guzmán and Carver's careers. Later, he contemplates what to do with the $11 million of Gallegos' money he secretly kept.

Cast

 Larry Fishburne as DEA Agent Russell Stevens Jr. / John Hull
Cory Curtis as Young Russell Stevens Jr.
 Jeff Goldblum as David Jason
 Yvette Heyden as Nancy Jason
 Charles Martin Smith as DEA Agent Gerry Carver
 Victoria Dillard as Betty McCutcheon
 Gregory Sierra as Felix Barbossa
 David Weixelbaum as Chino
 Glynn Turman as Russell Stevens Sr.
 Arthur Mendoza as Anton Gallegos
 Clarence Williams III as Detective Taft
 Roger Guenveur Smith as Eddie
 James T. Morris as "Ivy"
 Alisa Christensen as Ivy's Driver
 Roberto Luis Santana as Dealer 
 Kamala Lopez as Belinda Chacon
 Lira Angel as Bijoux
 Rene Assa as Hector Guzman
 Alex Colon as Molto
 Jaime Cardriche as "Shark"
 Sandra Gould as Mrs. G.
 Sydney Lassick as "Gopher"
 John Boyd West as "Cal Tech"
 Julio Oscar Mechoso as Detective Hernandez
 Paunita Nichols as Jacquiline
 Clifton Powell as Officer Leland
 Lionel Matthews as Officer Winston

Reception
Deep Cover was released on April 17, 1992 in 901 theaters, and grossed $3.4 million on its opening weekend. It went on to make $16.6 million in North America.

The majority of critics responded favorably towards Deep Cover. Film critic Roger Ebert gave the film three-and-a-half stars out of four and praised the voice-over narration as "poetic and colorful. That's part of the process elevating the story from the mundane to the mythic". Janet Maslin, in her review for The New York Times, praised the "quietly commanding Larry Fishburne and the wry Jeff Goldblum, who make an interestingly offbeat team". In his review for The Chicago Reader, Jonathan Rosenbaum wrote, "What emerges is a powerhouse thriller full of surprises, original touches, and rare political lucidity". Rolling Stone magazine's Peter Travers wrote, "Duke (A Rage in Harlem) makes the perks of the drug lifestyle palpably seductive. But this time there's something new in the snortscrew-slay formula: a working conscience".

Entertainment Weekly gave the film a "B−" rating and Owen Gleiberman wrote, "The movie peels away every layer of hope, revealing a red-hot core of nihilistic despair. Fishburne, with his hair-trigger line readings and deadly reptilian gaze, conveys the controlled desperation of someone watching his own faith unravel. And Goldblum reveals a new dimension of comic rottishness". In her review for The Independent, Sheila Johnston wrote: "The disappointment of Night and the City has left some critics lamenting that film noir is dead in the water, but Deep Cover displays many hallmarks of the genre, down to the diffuse paranoia (perhaps the entire operation is a high-level Washington cover-up). It was the most unexpected pleasure to arrive here in many a month". In its 2021 retrospective, The A.V. Clubs Ignatiy Vishnevetsky wrote "As a depiction of crime, law enforcement, and drug dealing, the film is a cartoon; as an exploration of the Man's ulterior motives, it's trenchant and angry. Stylistic and attitudinal cues come by way of Miami Vice, anti-heroic Blaxploitation, and the politicized, independent-minded B-films of Samuel Fuller."

However, not all critics liked the movie. In his review for The Washington Post, Desson Howe wrote, "With Boyz n the Hood, Fishburne broke through to the big time. Here, his acting career takes a step backwards". Despite this, of Jeff Goldblum he stated that "Oddly enough, Goldblum's so wildly out of place in this misbegotten movie, he becomes its greatest asset".

On Rotten Tomatoes, the film holds a rating of 87% from 30 reviews with the consensus: "Deep Cover rises above standard-issue crime thriller fare  thanks to a smartly cynical script and powerhouse performances from its unorthodox but well-matched leads."

Soundtrack
The film's soundtrack, Deep Cover, was released by SOLAR Records and Epic Records on April 4, 1992. It was recorded by Dr. Dre and newcomer Snoop Doggy Dogg in 1991 and 1992. Containing a mix of hip hop, reggae and R&B tracks, it peaked at No. 166 on the Billboard 200 and No. 9 on the Top R&B/Hip-Hop Albums.

Home media
The film was released on Blu-Ray for the first time by the Criterion Collection on July 13, 2021.

See also
 Laurence Fishburne filmography
 List of hood films

References

External links
 
 
 
 
 Official trailer
Deep Cover: Who’ll Pay Reparations on My Soul? an essay by Michael B. Gillespie at the Criterion Collection

1992 films
1990s English-language films
1992 action thriller films
1992 crime thriller films
1990s mystery thriller films
American action thriller films
American crime thriller films
American gang films
American mystery thriller films
American neo-noir films
Films about the Drug Enforcement Administration
Fictional portrayals of the Los Angeles Police Department
Films about Colombian drug cartels
Films about drugs
Films directed by Bill Duke
Films scored by Michel Colombier
Films set in 1972
Films set in 1991
Films set in Los Angeles
Films with screenplays by Michael Tolkin
Hood films
New Line Cinema films
African-American films
1990s American films